Isiala-Ngwa North is a Local Government Area of Abia State, Nigeria. Its headquarter is in the town of Okpuala-Ngwa.
 
It has an area of 283 km and a population of 153,734 at the 2006 census.

The postal code of the area is 451.

Famous people from Isiala-Ngwa North;

Jaja Wachuku: First indigenous Speaker of Nigerian House of Representatives.

Paul Ogwuma: CEO/MD Union bank, CBN Governor.

See also 
List of villages in Abia State

References

Local Government Areas in Abia State